The Lakes is a railway station located on the North Warwickshire Line in the north of Stratford-on-Avon District in Warwickshire, England. The nearest settlement is the village of Earlswood.

Opened by the Great Western Railway as The Lakes Halt on 3 June 1935. The station was built to serve the nearby Earlswood Lakes, which were a popular destination for daytrippers.

Services
It is a request stop: passengers wishing to board a train here must signal to the driver; those wishing to alight must inform the train conductor. In addition, due to the short length of the platforms, passengers boarding or alighting here must only do so through the front carriage. All services are operated by West Midlands Railway.

References

External links

Photographs of The Lakes Halt at www.warwickshirerailways.com
Rail Around Birmingham and the West Midlands: The Lakes station

Railway stations in Warwickshire
DfT Category F2 stations
Former Great Western Railway stations
Railway stations in Great Britain opened in 1935
Railway stations served by West Midlands Trains
Railway request stops in Great Britain
Tanworth-in-Arden